Quercus stellata, the post oak or iron oak, is a North American species of oak in the white oak section. It is a slow-growing oak that lives in dry areas on the edges of fields, tops of ridges also grows in poor soils, and is resistant to rot, fire, and drought. Interbreeding occurs among white oaks, thus many hybrid species combinations occur.

The species is native to the eastern and central United States, and found along the east coast from Massachusetts to Florida, and as far inland as Nebraska. It is identifiable by the rounded cross-like shape formed by the leaf lobes and hairy underside of the leaves.

Description 

The leaves have a very distinctive shape, with three perpendicular terminal lobes, shaped much like a Maltese cross. They are leathery, and tomentose (densely short-hairy) beneath. The branching pattern of this tree often gives it a rugged appearance.

Similar species 
Both Quercus stellata and Q. alba are in a section of Quercus called the white oaks. In the white oak section, Q. stellata is a sister taxon with Q. alba. Q. stellata is sold and distributed as white oak. One identifiable difference between the two trees is that Q. stellata is 'hairy' on the underside of the leaf.

Taxonomy 
The specific epithet stellata is Latin for "star"; it is named this because the trichome hairs on the bottom of  the leaves are stellate or star-shaped. Several variants of Q. stellata were named by American botanist Charles Sprague Sargent. The variety most recognised by the United States Forest Service is Q. stellata var. paludosa Sarg (delta post oak).

Varieties 
Varieties include:
 var. margarettiae (Ashe) Sarg.
 var. paludosa Sarg.
 var. boyntonii (Beadle) Sarg.
 var. anomala Sarg.
 var. attenuata Sarg.
 var. araniosa Sarg.
 var. palmeri Sarg.
 var. parviloba Sarg.
 var. rufescens Sarg.

Hybrids

Distribution and habitat 
Q. stellata is found in the Southeastern United States both inland and along the coast, then in a narrow range along the coastal plain from Maryland to coastal Massachusetts, then westward to Texas, and inland to Iowa. In Texas, the Post Oak Savannah extends down to, and ends in, far northwestern Atascosa county where a fairly dense population exists.  Normally found at the edge of a forest, it typically grows in dry, sandy areas, deficient of nutrients.

Ecology 
Q. stellata has the ability to survive fires by having thicker bark. It is useful for fire surveys where the tree rings are used to get a fire history of an area. A tree ring survey of 36 trees in Illinois provided a 226-year tree ring record that indicated that many Q. stellata persisted through annual fire return intervals of 1.44 fires/year for over 100 years.

It is used for food for deer, turkeys, squirrels, and other rodents, but because the nuts contain tannin, it is toxic to cattle.

Uses 
Because of its ability to grow in dry sites, attractive crown, and strong horizontal branches, it is used in urban forestry. It is resistant to decay, so it is used for railroad ties, siding, planks, construction timbers, stair risers and treads, flooring, pulp, veneer, particle board, fuel, and its namesake fence posts. It is one of the most common types of wood used for Central Texas barbecue.

References

External links 
 IPNI
 Kew
 Flora of North America
 Plants.USDA.gov
 US Forest Service
 Flora of the Southern and Mid-Atlantic States
 Q. stellata images from Vanderbilt University
 photo of herbarium specimen at Missouri Botanical Garden, collected in Missouri in 1939

stellata
Endemic flora of the United States
Trees of the Eastern United States
Trees of the Southern United States
Flora of the Northeastern United States
Flora of the Southeastern United States
Flora of the United States
Plants described in 1787